Janin may refer to:

People 
 Janin Lindenberg (born 1987), German track and field athlete
 Janin Reinhardt (born 1981), German television presenter and actress
 Albert Stanley Janin (1881-1931), U.S. hydro-airplane inventor
 Jules Janin (1804-1874), French writer and critic
 Maurice Janin (1862-1946), French general
 Michael Janin, DC Comics comic book artist
 Pascal Janin (born 1956), French footballer and football manager
 Raymond Janin, (1882-1972), French Byzantinologist
 Zuzanna Janin (born 1961), Polish visual artist and actor

Places 
 Jenin, Palestinian city 
Janin, Kuyavian-Pomeranian Voivodeship (north-central Poland)
Janin, Podlaskie Voivodeship (north-east Poland)
Janin, Masovian Voivodeship (east-central Poland)
Janin, Pomeranian Voivodeship (north Poland)
 Stary Janin

See also 
Janin Plot, a biochemical visualisation method